The manga series Komi Can't Communicate features an extensive cast of characters created by Tomohito Oda. The story mostly takes place at the elite Itan Private High School, and follows Shōko Komi, who is suffering from a crippling social anxiety disorder on her quest to make 100 friends with the help of her classmate Hitohito Tadano.

The names of the majority of the characters are puns or plays on words, usually related to their most defining character trait. The Japanese spellings are taken from the official fanbook.

Main characters

Komi is a high school girl who suffers from extreme social anxiety, which prevents her from communicating with other people. Komi has long, black hair with a purple tinge. She is described as extremely beautiful, garnering the adoration of others. Komi is usually drawn with a detailed face and almond-shaped eyes. When she is anxious, shocked, surprised, or on many other occasions, her appearance switches to a simplified face dominated by very large, round eyes. When Komi is excited, cat ears tend to appear on her head, of which Komi  and sometimes others are aware. She tends to motivate herself by pumping both fists.
Due to her communication disorder, Komi never had been able to make friends in elementary and middle school. Because of this, she feels lonely when entering high school. Her wish is to befriend 100 people before graduation from high school. Due to Komi's beauty and stoic, somewhat aristocratic demeanor, she is very popular among her classmates and quickly garners an adoring, but distanced following. Komi's silence tends to be mistaken as aloofness, despite her simply being too afraid to talk. Her big-eyed, anxious look after having been addressed is often mistaken for anger, further deterring other people from becoming close to her. Initially, Komi is completely unable to speak with anyone outside her family. Even there, she speaks so rarely that even her brother dismisses the possibility of having heard her voice. When Komi tries to speak, she either freezes completely or stutters severely. Over the course of the story, she slowly learns to talk to others first over a phone and speak short sentences in person. By her second school year, she is able to hold longer conversations when emotionally invested. When she is in her third year, she even manages to speak with intimidating strangers (albeit nervously). Her social anxiety also leads to her being very insecure and overthinking her actions. Komi is also quite pessimistic about herself, usually believing that any misunderstandings are a result of her own fault. That despite everyone's' praises of her, she still considers herself to be boring and uninteresting. Even initially thinking that's it's she herself who is unworthy to be with Tadano.
Hitohito Tadano is the first one (outside her family) to recognize her social anxiety and to which she develops a friendship. Tadano helps her find more friends, with the assistance of Najimi Osana. Komi quickly develops romantic feelings for Tadano, but is for the longest time too shy and worried to express her feelings or to act on them. Only after Tadano confesses his own feelings to her, she is able to do so and the two become a couple. Over the course of their relationship, Komi becomes more flirtatious and starts to tease Tadano.
Komi is a very kind and caring person, trying to help others whenever possible. Despite her anxiety, Komi is a very good student, usually being at the top of her class in tests. She is also good at sports, allowing her to be a serious competitor to the very sportive Chika Netsuno. She only learns how to ride a bike when Tadano teaches her, though. Komi likes to read and is a good cook. She is very fond of cats and owns several plush cats and cat dolls. After learning about a cat café in her town, she quickly becomes a regular and befriends the normally very distanced black cat Chocolat.
Aside of Tadano, her closest friends are Manbagi, Katō, and Sasaki.
Her name is Komi, when written in the Japanese order, refers to the Japanese term .

Tadano is a student at the prestigious Itan High School and Komi's seatmate. He has short black hair with a white flower-shaped cowlick. A recurring joke is that Tadano is otherwise completely average: he is of average size (for a Japanese teenager), has average grades, shows average performance at sports, etc. He intends to be completely normal and not stand out, but his plans are foiled when he meets Komi on his first day at Itan High School and discovers her communication disorder. As such, he befriends her and promises to help her to accomplish her dream of having 100 friends, with him being the first.
In middle school, Tadano was a chūnibyō: he slicked back his hair, popped up his collar, and tried to act cool. After becoming completely embarrassed by a failed attempt to confess his love to his classmate Kawai, he dropped this persona and decided to become completely normal.
Tadano has an almost uncanny ability to figure out what other people are feeling and thinking, which helps him to form a relationship to the other students, especially those with a communication disorder like Komi and Katai. He is kind and caring and likes to help other people, but this also leads to him being taken advantage of, including by his teachers. In his first year, he gets elected as class council president instead of Komi (who gets elected to be "God") because no other student wants to do the job.
Initially, Tadano is very almost universally disliked by his classmates, mainly for the jealousy of his closeness to Komi, or met with indifference at best. Over the time, he becomes increasingly popular due to his kind demeanor. By his third year, some students attempt to vie to be his "number one" friend.
Tadano very quickly develops romantic feelings for Komi, but rejects the idea of her being interested in him for the longest time. As a result, he does not act on his feelings and prefers to set them out of mind, until Manbagi – who also fell in love with him – makes him realize his love for Komi. After he confesses to her, the two become a couple and start dating.
On several occasions, Tadano is forced to dress up in women's clothings. Komi thinks he looks cute as a girl, and even some of the boys start to fantasizing about dating him as "Tadano-kun-chan". Due to this crossdressing and the supposed romantic-like friendship to Katai, his family starts to believe him to be gay.
Tadano lives with his parents and his younger sister Hitomi in a fairly small flat in an apartment block where he has to share a room with Hitomi. He is very enthusiastic about old buildings and want to become a teacher after school.
Tadano's name is a play on words:  means "an ordinary/average person", and  means "human" or "compassionate".

First year classmates

Najimi is an old friend of Tadano and their gender is unknown. In Middle School, they dressed in a boy's uniform but in High School they primarily dress as a girl (wearing a skirt but a shirt with a necktie instead of a ribbon). Their unspecified gender leads to comedic situations throughout the series, such as their choice of a dressing room and how to grade their performance in sports.
Najimi is socially extremely skilled and everybody's friend. Through their social ability they are able to becomes friends with anyone in a few minutes. Despite their social skills, Najimi initially does not want to become Komi's friend. They met her already in elementary school and wanted to befriend her, but got scared off by Komi's silence and staring. Only after Komi "saved" them from some unwanted suitor, Najimi warms up to Komi.
Especially early on, Najimi is a crucial catalyst for Komi getting more acquainted to social situations by organising get-togethers and trips during summer vacation, involving her in games, or making Komi order food for him in cafés and sandwich shops. Najimi also instigates situations in which Komi and Tadano get to know each other better, thus furthering their romantic relationship.
Najimi is abject to studying, but gets good grades. They often organize pranks or cause mischief in other ways. Najimi has a tendency to have a gambling addiction, and keeps coming up with shady business schemes for the school's culture festivals.
Najimi's full name  literally means "childhood friend".

Agari is a fearful girl in Komi's class, who gets nervous when having to speak to others. Najimi picked her as potential friend for Komi due to their similar traits. Agari is initially scared of Komi following her in hiding (as Komi is herself to anxious to speak to Agari), but then gets the idea that Komi is trying to encourage her. Feeling not worthy of Komi's friendship, she agrees to become her dog, revealing her masochist traits.
Agari is a foodie and shows her confident and knowledgeable side when it comes to food.  She also posts restaurant reviews on an internet site. Her aunt owns a food stand. Agari has a voluptuous figure and is somewhat self-conscious of her large breasts.

Yamai is obsessed with Komi, claiming to be in love with her. Because of that, she is extremely jealous of Tadano due to his closeness to Komi. Initially, she tries to deter Tadano from coming close to Komi and later even kidnaps and threatens him. Only after Yamai profusely apologizes for her actions, Komi agrees to become friends with her.
She fetishizes objects related to Komi (e.g. a hair from Komi, an old pantyhose, or a cup Komi drank from). She also regularly comes up with schemes to get Komi in slightly sexual situations. which consistently fail. Komi's self appointed bodyguards, Kishi in particular, keep foiling Yamai's attempts to harass Komi.
Yamai is from the beginning friends with Himeko Kishi and Akako Onigashima. She is musically gifted and plays violin and piano. Her family is wealthy and tends to spend their vacation overseas.
Her relationship to Nakanaka could be described as frenemies. While the two constantly quarrel and compete for Komi's affection, Yamai coaches Nakanaka's band before their performance at the culture festival and plays with them on stage. The two also fight side-by-side in a school-wide battle royale (with toy guns) in their third year. Lily Sukida ships them as Yama x Naka.
Her family name is homophone to the Japanese word  meaning "illness" or "sickness", while "Ren" is a different reading of the kanji 愛, meaning "love". Her name is also a reference to her yandere nature.

Nakanaka is a chūnibyō who imagines being a reincarnation of a warrior called "Arsot Les Primavera" from a fantasy world, who is carrier of a secret "dragon force". Before meeting Komi, Nakanaka was lonely and hadn't had any friends since elementary school. She used her imagination to cope with her feelings of isolation. She tries to become friends with Komi by pretending to know her from an earlier life as "Princess Komila". After Komi notices that Nakanaka feels alone during physical education, she reaches out to Nakanaka and becomes her friend. Nakanaka is socially awkward and does not really know how to interact with other people. In her second year at Itan High School, she manages to befriend Mako Ojousa, Tonatsu Hanya, and Towa Bosa, somewhat with the unintended help of Ren Yamai.
In school, Nakanaka tends to wear her jacket over her shoulders as a cape, has (fake) bandages on her left arm, and a fingerless glove on her right hand. Most of the time, she wears an eye bandage, which she claims to contain her "dragon force". On some occasions, she wears a colored contact lens underneath the eyepatch. Outside of school, she dresses in a mild goth style.
Nakanaka is an avid gamer, although not extremely skilled. She often plays a mobile MMO called "PGO" (a riff on Fate/Grand Order, "FGO" for short). She is also shown to collect manga, anime poster, and corresponding figurines. In her second year at Itan High School, she forms a rock band called "Perro Rabioso" ("Mad Dog" in Spanish) together with Mako, Tonatsu, and Towa with Yamai's support. Nakanaka is the singer and writes the lyrics.
Her relationship with Yamai is characterized by dispute, with both of them vying for Komi's affection. Despite this, there is also an underlying friendship between them as they also support each other, e.g. when Yamai coaches Nakanaka's band or when Nakanaka and her bandmates provide Yamai moral support after Komi got together with Tadano as a couple.
Nakanaka's name is written with the kanji  which can alternatively read as "chū", referencing her nature as chuunibyou. Her given name consist of the kanji 思 and 春, meaning "thought, imagination" and "spring, adolescence" respectively, alluding to chuunibyou being the state of an adolescent having delusions of grandeur.

Makeru is Komi's self-proclaimed rival. She constantly tries to compete with her in all kinds of activities, despite Komi never being aware of a competition between them. From physical traits and performance in sports, to grades, cooking skills and all kinds of games.. But she loses every time. Though, her losing streak is not only limited to competitions with Komi.
Her name is a play of words on the phrase , meaning "I hate losing."

Kishi usually wears partial knight's armor on her left arm and legs. She is initially part of Yamai's circle of friends, but becomes quickly one of Komi's most loyal followers. She is part of Komi's self-proclaimed honour guard and regularly acts as foil to Yamai's attempts to come too close to Komi.
Despite her appearing first in chapter 8 of the manga, her face isn't shown until chapter 270. Before that, her face is always covered up by other characters or speech bubbles, or simply not drawn. She is not depicted to really interact with Komi before Chapter 331.
Kishi is trained in martial arts, fencing, and horseback riding and is part of the school's volleyball team. She protects Komi out of a desire to serve and loses her purpose after Komi tells her she does not want Kishi to be her servant. Kishi shortly becomes a delinquent, but finds her way again after Komi explains she would prefer her protection as a friend.
Her name,  is homophone to the Japanese word , meaning "knight". Together with her given name Himeko, which means "princess", her name describes her as "Princess Knight".

Like Kishi is Onigashima is part of Yamai's circle of friends. She is usually carefree and friendly but gets quickly irritated by minor drawbacks, causing her to rage like a demon. Her name means "Red Girl from Oni Island" which is a reference to the tale of Momotaro.

Chiarai is friends with Sonoda and Shinobino. He has ruffled hair with a short braid and hairpins. Along with this friends, he starts the tradition of the boys in class fantasizing about dating the girls. He is also a fan of Yadano, and is a member of the small "Yadano-san Fan Club". His name is a reference to charao, which is the male counterpart of a gyaru.

Sonoda has long, black, slicked back hair. Along with his friends Chiarai and Shinobino, he regularly fantasizes about dating the girls in his class. He has been shown to have a crush on Nakanaka in particular. His name is a pun on the phrase , meaning "that's it", while is given name  means "the general trend/situation".

Shinobino dresses and acts like a ninja, including constantly wearing a face mask. He is part of Komi's self-appointed bodyguards. His name is a reference to his ninja attitude, being homophone to the Japanese term , meaning "a person in hiding".

Inaka is a girl from the countryside who strives to be a city girl, who speaks with a noticeable dialect. She is scared of others shunning her for being a country girl, although in reality most of her classmates already know. Inaka sees Komi as example of how to be a perfect city girl and tries to imitate her.
Inaka lives in the same town as Komi's grandmother, where she helps out as miko at a shrine during winter break. She is Komorebi Hiki's cousin. Her name  means literally "country girl".

Onemine is a kind and reliable girl who is seen by her classmates as having a sisterly personality. Except Najimi, she is one of the first to notice the budding love between Komi and Tadano. Onemine's closest friend is Otori, with whom she usually keeps holding hands to keep Otori from vanishing. She lives with three younger unruly sibling in a small house. Her name refers to the Japanese word for "big sister" .

Otori is a girl with a ditzy and sluggish personality. Everything she does, she does very slowly. Despite that, Otori has a tendency to vanish unexpectedly and finding herself in odd places, a trait she shares with her mother. She is good friends with Onemine and usually together with her. Otori lives in a huge, European style mansion. Her name is a pun on the Japanese word , meaning "calm" or "gentle".

Katai is a tall and muscular student with an intimidating appearance, who everyone sees as a delinquent. However, he is actually a kind and timid person, who like Komi suffers from a communication disorder. He only joins the class several months into the semester, after first having been sick on the first day of school, and then too shy to enter the campus afterwards. To raise confidence, he worked out, built muscle, and dyed his hair. He usually talks in a low and gravelly voice which is hard to make out, adding to the misunderstanding of Katai being a delinquent.
Tadano is the only one initially approaching Katai without fear and in a friendly way, which causes Katai to become almost immediately enamored with Tadano. Their friendship is often joked to be of an almost romantic nature, often to Komi's confusion. Katai is scared of Komi (who in turn is scared of Katai), but sees her as "communication master" who is trying to teach him how to properly communicate. Katai's family owns a martial arts dojo and all have the same intimidating appearance.

Naruse is a student who has delusions of grandeur due to being a bishōnen. He believes all that his classmates admire and adore him, although they are mostly indifferent about him. Naruse initially believes that only Komi is worthy of him, because of her beauty. But has since found friendship in other classmates as well. Despite being narcissistic, he is fundamentally kind and friendly. Offering his lunch to Tadano or convincing Ase that she deserves to love herself.
Over the course of the manga, Naruse and Ase get closer and ultimately start dating. Naruse's grandfather is shown to be at least as narcissistic as himself, albeit in a more cheerful manner.
Naruse's name is a play on words with the Japanese term for "narcissist", .

Kometani is friends with Naruse. He keeps commenting on the story, breaking the fourth wall, and always talks in captions instead of speech bubbles. While initially only commenting on events where he is present, he later also does so even when he is not actually part of story at the point.
His face is normally drawn only very stylized, except for a very few exceptions. Kometani's name is a pun on the English word "commentate".

Sasaki is a member of Komi's group for the Year 1 field trip, where she and Katō plan to make the trip as enjoyable for Komi as possible. She is a highly gifted yo-yo master as she landed 3rd place in the world championship. But as she has been ridiculed about this in the past, Sasaki initially tries to keep this secret. So she disguises with a hannya mask and takes up the stagename "Y. Y. Hannya". Komi and Kato are both aware of her "secret" identity. On occasions, Sasaki uses her yo-yo skills to earn money.
Sasaki is one of Komi's closest friends. She, Komi, and Kato often meet at Kato's house to drink tea and discuss love matters. Sasaki mischievously plays matchmaker on several occasions, arranging situations where one of her friends has to interact with their respective crushes.
In contrast to most other names, Sasaki's name is not a pun or play on words: Ayami Sasaki is an anagram of "Asamiya Saki", the name of a character from the manga series Sukeban Deka who uses a yo-yo to fight crime.

Katō is a member of Komi's group for the Year 1 field trip, who aspires to be a competitive shogi player. She is highly organised and plans out Komi's, Sasaki's, and her field trip to Kyoto to the minute. Along with Sasaki, she is aware of Komi's crush on Tadano and highly supportive of both of them getting together. Katō herself has a crush on Katai.
Katō lives with her family in a huge mansion in a traditional Japanese style, where she, Sasaki, and Komi regularly meet to discuss love matters. While there, they get dressed up in kimono by her mother Yakuna Katō.
Katō's name is unusual among the names of the characters in the series, as it is no pun or wordplay. Instead, it is a reference to the well-known shogi player Hifumi Katō. Both their given names are made up of numbers:  means "three, nine, two", while  means "one, two, three".

Satō is a sweet girl who always agrees to do favors for anyone who would ask her. She is a member of the Sociology Club together with Ushiroda and Maeda. The Japanese word  means "sugar" and  means "sweetness". The Japanese word for "sweet"  can also mean "naive".

Ushiroda is a member of the Sociology Club together with Satō and Maeda. She is worried about Satō's over-benevolence. Her name is a pun on the Japanese expression , meaning "being behind", because she sits behind Komi in class.

Maeda is a member of the Sociology Club together with Satō and Ushiroda. He expresses his interest in older women on several occasions, earning him the nickname , "loves older women". His name "Maeda" refers to him sitting in front of Komi, as  means "being in front".

Seikimatsu is a tall and muscular character with a very distinct mohawk and fringe of hair. He returns as a classmate in Komi and Tadano's third year class, where he develops a friendship with Tadano. Shown to have always wanted to apologize to Tadano for elbowing him in the face in their first year. His name means literally "end of the century man" and is a reference to the Fist of the Northstar characters Kenshiro and Raoh, who both bear similar titles.

A boy in the class who dresses and styles his hair like a samurai.

Otaku has a striking face and wears horn-rimmed glasses. Despite being introduced as not looking like an otaku, he still shows typical otaku interests, like manga, movies, and novels.
Class Delinquents
A group of four unnamed delinquents. One always wears a baseball cap and a hoodie, one has curtain bangs, the third one has his hair combed straight up, and the fourth constantly wears a medical face mask. The four are part of Komi's self-appointed bodyguard. They are initially scared of Katai, but soon come to admire him due to his physique.

Second year classmates

Manbagi is a gyaru who joins Tadano and Komi's class in their second year of high school. She initially presented herself with an excessive amount of ganguro make-up, scaring people off. She befriends Tadano and Komi when they help her after an anxiety attack. Manbagi puts off the make-up after Komi and Tadano tell her she would look better without.
Manbagi quickly becomes Komi's best friend and confidant. Her reactions to Tadano are initially abrasive, as she does not know how to react to his kindness and compliments. But she quickly develops romantic feelings for him, such as when Tadano protected her from the advances by the Golden Skulls. Feelings that she finally acknowledges during their alone time at the fireworks festival. Manbagi is initially unaware that Komi is also in love with Tadano, until she realizes it when watching Komi and Tadano play a romantic scene in the class' stageplay at the culture festival. When Manbagi decides to give up on Tadano for Komi's sake, Komi refuses as she does not want to be responsible for Manbagi's unhappiness while also being insecure about Tadano's feelings for her. Despite both being in love with Tadano and vying for his affection, Manbagi and Komi are both determined to remain friends.
After some unsuccessful attempts, Manbagi finally manages to confess her love to Tadano and asks him to date, which he initially accepts. But noticing his inner uncertainty, she asks him whether he is really sure about his feelings, which makes him acknowledge his own love for Komi. With her blessing, Manbagi urges him to confess to her. Though, Manbagi is left heartbroken, but finds support from her classmates and friends. In her third year in high school, she overcomes her love sickness and starts to get closer to her new seatmate Taketoshi Wakai.
Before meeting Komi, Manbagi was already friends with Yukapoyo, Mutan, and Gonzales, three other gyarus. She owns a goldfish called , named after Hitohito Tadano. ( means people).
Manbagi's name is a direct reference to her initial styling as Manba Gyaru.

Ase is a girl who sweats profusely. She is highly self-conscious about this and feels everyone is disgusted of her. She befriends Komi and Manbagi when they lend her an antiperspirant. Ase is Isagi's closest friend, having known her since elementary school. When getting to know Naruse, she becomes inspired by his words to her and his pride in himself, which encourages her to have confidence too. Over the course of the manga, she and Naruse get closer and eventually start dating.
Her name  means "drops of sweat".

Isagi is a germaphobe, who wants to become the student council president. She cannot stand to be touched by other people, thoroughly washing herself if she cannot avoid it, and desinfects her desk and items constantly. She has very high moral standards, which makes her willing to bear with physical contact when attempting to help someone in need. Due to her standards, she also initially refuses any help in her election campaign.
Her ambition stems from an incident at the entrance ceremony, when incumbent student council president Ichō's actions inspired her. Despite finding out that Ichō and her actions were not what she believed, Isagi is not discouraged. She ultimately manages to win the election due to speeches by Ase and herself, which are brutally honest about her flaws.
Isagi knows Ase since elementary school. She feels responsible for Ase's low self-esteem because she called her filthy shortly after Isagi developed her germaphobia. Ase forgave her though and remained friendly with her, but Isagi nevertheless acted distant to Ase out of guilt for several years.
During the second year's culture festival, Isagi forms the "Federation for Breaking Illicit Relationships" – or "FBI" for short – with the student council to prevent "immoral" behaviour between students of opposite gender. They do so by hitting the perpetrators with toy hammers. Isagi does not approve of the relationship between Ase and Naruse because she thinks he is an idiot.
The kanji in her name both mean "clean" or "pure".

Ohai likes breasts. During the second and third year fitness tests, she comments on the chest size of the other girls. She also acts as judge during the Summer Uniform Grand Prix and the Smile contest. Along with Toutoi and Fukusuki, she forms the "Riverside Magazine Hunters Club", looking for thrown-away erotic magazines on the river bank.

Tōtoi looks like Buddha, but has a very lecherous character. Together with Ohai and Fukusuki he forms the "Riverside Magazine Hunters Club". Tōtoi regularly organises contents where the unsuspecting participants are judged by their looks, like the annual Summer Uniform Grand Prix and the Smile Contest. For a test of courage, in which Najimi pranks Komi and Tadano, he gets painted gold to appear as a Buddha statue.
His name  means "noble" or "sacred", which in this case is ironic as Tōtoi is neither.

Fukusuki likes summer uniforms. He often acts as a judge for certain occasions, such as the Summer Uniform Grand Prix or the Smile contest Despite his prim demeanor, he still has a fairly perverted side. Together with Toutoi and Ohai, he is part of the "Riverside Magazine Hunters Club". He becomes the costume designer for class 2-1's stageplay during the school's culture festival.
His name is a play on words of the phrase , literally "likes summer uniforms".

Fushima is a hobby mangaka. She is into yaoi and ships Tadano and Katai as "Kata x Tada". She was forced by Najimi to introduce herself to the class by rapping. 
Her name means "rotten/debauched works", referring to her lewd fantasies.

Takarazuka is an androgynous, handsome girl who is a talented actor. Though she only acts male roles, feeling that female roles are beyond her believability. Takarazuka is aware of the unspoken love between Komi and Tadano, so she arranges situations where they both have an opportunity to get closer. Her name is a reference to the all-female Takarazuka Revue musical troupe.

Gekidan is a girl who always wears a lion costume headpiece. She is theatrical and into acting. During the classes' attempt to get Komi's contact info, she performs a musical number in her try. Her name is direct reference to the Japanese musical theatre company of the same name .

Kichō is a character who is very thorough and always wants precision and accuracy. He can be bothered if something is even a millimeter out of place. He tries to get Komi's contact details by writing his own on a rice corn, which unfortunately gets blown away.

Uruna is a girl who dresses like a fortune teller and has a tear shaped mole under her eye. Fitting her outfit, she constantly tries to sell trinkets and talismans to students and visitors of the culture festival.

Fuwa is a small rotund girl with a soft belly and constant smile on her face, who is something like the class mascot.

Bodou is a boy who has a very motherly nature and interacts with his classmates as if he were their parent. e.g. bringing them water or fruit. or just being caring. So much so that they frequently refer to him as a "mom", which he hates being called. His name is a play on words with the Japanese word for "mother" .
Ichinose, Ninomai, Santori, and Shishima are seatmates and tend to do everything together. Their names are puns on the Japanese words for "one" , "two" , "three" , and "four" , earning them the nickname "The Number Guys" .

Inui is a boy whose hair makes him look as if he has dog ears. He is constantly quarreling with Sarutahiko. his childhood "friend". It's implied that they've been getting along better ever since Valentine's Day, being awoken to deeper feelings. His name is a pun on the Japanese word for "dog" .

Sarutahiko is a girl who resembles a monkey due to her hair. She is always getting in arguments with Inui. her childhood "friend". It's implied they've been getting along better since Valentine's, being awoken to deeper feelings. Her name references the Shinto god Sarutahiko Ōkami, whose name  can be translated as "Prince of the Monkey Fields".

Baba is a girl whose head resembles a goldfish. She always follows the flow of what everyone else is doing or saying, constantly repeating her catchphrase "That's right!". She remarked once that it's impossible for her to do things of her own volition. Her name  literally means "goldfish".

Tsunde is a tsundere. It was revealed on White Day that she fell in love with Bodou.

Toro is a seductive, but lazy girl who uses her appeal to charm the boys into doing her all kinds of favors, including carrying her up the stairs. Komi and Manbagi ask her to teach them flirting techniques to get Tadano's attention.

Odoka looks like a vengeful spirit, specifically Sadako from the Ring franchise or Kayako Saeki from the Ju-On movies. She has long black hair, which falls over her eyes, and tends to stand stooped over. She first appears as a scarer in a haunted house during Komi's first school year's culture festival..

Doji is a clumsy girl who constantly trips and falls over. She once dropped her smartphone out of the window when trying to ask Komi for her contact information.

Ashitano is a girl who acts and talks like an upper-class lady, but has a weak endurance. Quickly burning out and losing all energy after a taxing task. The way she is drawn when burned out and her name are allusions to the boxing manga Ashita no Joe. Her given name  means "burn".

Hafuri dresses and acts like a person from the time of the Japanese bubble economy and still uses a pager.  Her name is a pun on the Japanese transliteration of "bubbly" . 

Usui is a student wearing a face-concealing cloth mask who believes that no one is able to see or notice him. However, he had always been a helping hand to his classmates from the sidelines. At the end of their school year, he is surprised to learn that Komi and the other students had always noticed him and his contributions to the class. Showing their gratitude and reaffirming his place among them. As of chapter 384, he's only had three appearances in the manga. With his dialogue implying that his character was simply forgotten by the author early on.

Third year classmates
Ojōsa, Hanya, and Bosa are Nakanaka's classmates in their second year at Itan High School, and classmates of Komi in their third year. They befriend Nakanaka after Yamai teases her for being alone, and later form the band "Perro Rabioso" together with both of them. Ojōsa plays the guitar, Bosa the bass, and Tonatsu is at the drums. Bosa has a dreamy demeanour, often staring blankly into space, but is despite that the best student in the school year.

Sukida is a girl who is very much into yuri fiction. She ships Nakanaka and Yamai as Yama x Naka. "Lily" is the English translation of the Japanese word .

Emoyama is a passionate girl who enjoys moments of life that illicit feelings of emotion. Which she refers to as her catchphrase "Emo!". She is vastly (and unnaturally) aware of the many events in her school's students' lives, even if they aren't exactly her classmates or friends. Such as knowing that Sasaki and Katō had fought in their first-year field trip when grouped with Komi. Or indicating that she knows that Tadano and Komi became friends using a chalkboard in first year. She was introduced back in second year and is also shown to be a strong supporter of Tadano and Komi's relationship. Her name is a pun on the word "emo".

Shiina is a girl who is very difficult and intractable. She often switches her mood in conversations, remains aloof in group activities, or will challenge others for aimless reasons. During the school battle royale, she berated Komi and her persona when she tried to stop her from quitting the game. Although Komi eventually won her over. She has since been slowly warming up to her. She has heavily pierced ears and mostly wears a hoodie over her uniform. Her name is a play on words with the Japanese word for "difficult", .

Omakawa is a girl who had always wanted to be called cute since middle school. She would try to compliment others in order to receive a similar response, but would fail because of the oddity of her approach and timing. Komi became the first one to finally call her cute. She likes being called cute as it raises her confidence and willpower, to the point of comically producing a visible wave of aura around her. Taken together, her name refers to her waiting to be called cute.

Ogiya is known for always using a pacifier, wearing a baby bib, and conversing in baby talk. Contrasted by his otherwise sharp facial features. Though he still retains the mentality of a normal high schooler. He soon becomes a new friend to Tadano and shown to be quite devoted to him. His name is made up from baby noises.

Kyouno speaks in an antiquated, dignified Kyoto dialect, and is often seen with a handkerchief in hand. She wants to make friends, but her way of speaking gives the impression that she is being sarcastic and condescending. Her name consists of the kanji for "Kyoto" (京都) and "old" (古).

Fuki is a clumsy man. Essentially the male counterpart of Doji, although his own clumsiness results in causing destruction around him.

Nanoda is a normal girl who uses her last name as her catchphrase and be a "nanoda" character, which is a common manga/anime trope. Although she realizes it embarrasses her to do so, she still commits to it because she feels that she can't make friends if she didn't have a unique character.  is a Japanese affirmative phrase, which can be translated with "It is!" or "it is surely so".

Kire regularly has an angered expression on her face, making others believe she's always bitter about something. But in truth, it's just the face she makes because of her bad eyesight. She also desires to make friends.  means "get angry".

Jimochi is a boy who suffers from hemorrhoids. 

Yuka is a girl who belongs to Manbagi's original trio of gyaru friends. Having been introduced in second year, she joins Komi and Tadano's class in third year. She displays typical gyaru traits, wearing strong makeup and brimming with personality. She tells others to call her "Yukapoyo".

Teachers and other students

An unnamed woman with glasses and a hair bun, who always wears a track suit. She is Komi's homeroom teacher in the first two years at school. She becomes promoted to the school's head teacher in third year.  Although she is normally dutiful in her position, she can sometimes be lazy and irresponsible. Such as taking advantage of Tadano's helpfulness,, entrusting important duties to someone else, falling asleep in transport on school trips, and a willingness to drink alcohol on student supervision.

Omojiri is an assistant teacher in Komi's second year class at school, and her homeroom teacher in her third year. Outwardly, she appears civil and punctual, barely showing any visible emotion. Behaving proper and carrying out her teaching duties with care. But in reality, she is a sloth who would prefer to loaf around. She is easily drained by her work and her daily errands, so much that she often collapses at home from exhaustion and sleeps through large parts of the weekend. Although she still wishes to maintain her image and dignity as a teacher. After Komi shows her some kindness outside of school, because of a made-up story she told when her inelegant appearance was exposed, Omojiri relaxes her proper persona and starts to show more compassionate friendliness behind it. Her family name Omojiri is a play on words on the phrase  (literally: "the butt is heavy"), which means "being lazy" and alludes to her demeanor outside school.

Netsuno is a highly competitive, second-year student who is hot-blooded. She has flame inspired physical traits such has her fire-like hair and flame styled eyes. In the first year Sports Festival, she originally approached Komi with a competitive declaration, stating that she felt no "hot" passion from her. She competed against her on the class relay race with them as the final runners. With Komi persevering even after a fall, Netsuno emerges as the victor, but declares that she felt Komi's passion after all, handshaking her. 
In second year, and her last year at school, she returns to compete with Komi in the same race out of sportsmanship. And although Komi races with more vigor than before, Netsuno still emerges victorious. The sight of Komi's visible frustration endears her, still thanking her for the match, and finally exchanging contacts. After her graduation, it is heavily implied that she is related to new first year student Aoi Netsuno, who shares her fire traits and hot-bloodedness. How specifically, is yet to be said. Her name  can be interpreted literally as "underground heat" or figuratively as "highly enthusiastic".

Gorimi is a large and muscular senpai who oversees the school library committee. She is known for enforcing quiet in the library by slapping perpetrators with her paper fan. If one is hit three times, she will remove them from the premises. After her eventual graduation, the Electrical engineering Club creates a robotic replacement for her in her likeness. For the purpose of continuing the slapping duties.

A group of first year delinquents who enrolled in Itan High School in Komi's second year. They apparently earned their name by defeating 172 other delinquents in a single month, despite the students of Itan never having heard of them. They initially entered the school with the intention of defeating Itan's own delinquents, by first taking on their supposed leader "Komi" (info told to them by Najimi). Upon entering Komi's class, they assume that Katai is "Komi" based on nothing but his appearance. They try different methods to challenge Katai, but each one fails as Katai never noticed them. In the end, Katai unknowingly manages to back them off. In the third-year battle royale, the Heavenly Kings took the role of leadership for the school's second year students. Managing to take the first years captive and challenge the third years, before eventually being defeated.
 (nickname: Left for dead), is the leader of the Heavenly Kings. Known for always wearing a bandana that cover his brows. Suteno has a very tough disposition and is willing to run headfirst into any kind of challenge in front of him. He's also somewhat respectful; announcing his presence when entering a room, carrying Hamaki when she tripped, or giving the first years the option of helping him during the battle royale. He also has a sensitive side, as he will get depressed when he is ignored or defeated easily. He often tries to challenge Katai in various clashes, still believing his name to be "Komi". 
 (nickname: Heaven's door), is the member who least looks like a delinquent, wearing his school uniform properly as well as a monocle. Although he appears dignified, he will still display delinquent behaviors such as confrontation and a willingness for violence.  
 (nickname: Scorpion), is the only female member who is always seen with a face mask. Despite her fierceness, she still has maidenly qualities. In different occasions, it's shown that she has a romantic crush on Suteno. Underneath her mask, she has braces. 
 (nickname: Blood chain), is the largest member who has a piercing on his left brow. Like the others, he is loyal to Suteno.    

Ichou is the former student council president who was introduced in Isagi's account on what inspired her to run in the presidential election, initially seeming like a dutiful and altruistic person. Upon meeting her however, it's revealed that she only has the position for her own amusement. Ichou is actually an eccentric and carefree girl who is prone to random foolery. Tending to whine like a child and having admitted to repeating a school year. She can also be selfish when inflicting her own bizarre ideas and impulses upon the students and others. After her step-down as president and her later graduation, she returns in Komi's third year as Itan High school's new substitute Principal. Under the claim that she is actually the granddaughter of the school's founder.

Imotō is a boy who desires to loved by everyone. To achieve this, they chose to become everyone's little sister. They generally wear a girl's uniform and a ribbon in their hair, hence their nickname "Ribbon" (their actual given name is ). Imotō first appears as their class representative at a school sports festival. While Imotō generally acts cute befitting their role as little sister, they have a scheming side: in an attempt to get Komi to become her 100th elder sibling, Imotō tried to get compromising material on Tadano, who they perceived to be in the way. When Imotō found that Tadano's behaviour is (almost) always exemplary, they wanted him to become their 100th sibling instead. Their name is a pun on the Japanese word for little sister, .

Anchi was introduced in a girl "mixer" arranged by Najimi for Komi. She is a foul-mouthed girl who has a habit of being blunt and rude to those she's talking to. Claiming that she likes to exploit faults in people and that she will always ridicule any possible friends. But it's apparent that she does feel guilt when doing so, being noticeably startled when she feels her words went too far. Hinting that underneath her exterior, she is actually a more tender and friendly person than she seems. With Komi and the others admitting that her insults never feel cruel intentioned.

Tsuzurafuji was introduced in a girl "mixer" arranged by Najimi for Komi. She has a tendency to greatly overthink the situations around her. Often overanalyzing every word said or action done. She is otherwise a simple girl who has a talent of making her eyes look in different directions.

Kogoen was introduced in a girl "mixer" arranged by Najimi for Komi. She is a girl who has an elegant and dignified demeanor, but has an extremely soft voice. A voice so quiet that barely anyone can make out her words, and that not even using a megaphone can raise her volume.  means "whisper" or "low voice". 

Hiki is a girl that is 180 cm, unusually tall for a Japanese girl of her age. She is very self-conscious of her height, so she spent the last year in middle-school as a shut in. She is Inaka's younger cousin. Hiki meets Komi when she visits a shrine in her hometown where she wants to pray for success in her high-school entrance exam. When Hiki collapses due to her anxiousness, Komi comes to her help and assuages Hiki's fears.
Hiki joins Itan High School when Komi starts her third year there. With her tallness, Hiki is crucial in the first year students winning the school-wide battle royale (with toy guns). She becomes good friends with her classmates Aoi Netsuno and Susumi Shujou.
This word describes the light shafts and the patterns on the ground created by the sunlight shining through the leaves of a tree. Taken together, the name Hiki Komorebi is a play on words with hikikomori, the Japanese term for shut ins.

Wakai is a boy who joins Manbagi's third year class as her new seatmate and is also the captain of the school's soccer team. He has a case of Gynophobia and avoids interacting with females in general. According to him, talking to girls makes him overly conscious and causes him a lot of stress. He feels that he has to appeal to them or otherwise they will look down on him. He also has a limit on how much he can handle talking to girls if he has to, which will cause him to faint if it empties. Manbagi, out of her friendly nature, often calls out to him various times, which of course stresses him further. However, he has since been getting used to her, and slowly growing closer to her.

Family members

Hitomi is Hitohito's younger sister. She is very talkative and assertive, and tends to bombard new acquaintances with questions. From the second year of the story on, she attends Kisai High School, where she is classmates with Komi's younger brother Shōsuke and Katai's little sister Ai. As Shōsuke's seatmate, she presumes that he suffers from a communication disorder and takes it upon herself to help him make friends. Which she does by forcing him to interact with her and their classmates, and pressuring him into partaking in class activities. She has no romantic interest in him and only sees him as friend.
In contrast to her brother, who is average at everything and anything. Hitomi is shown to be talented and unique. Able to accurately mimic Shōsuke's voice and speak through ventriloquism, skilled in Judo, being sportive and blocking a goal shot from Shōsuke, able to overpower people bigger than her , and correcting the mistakes at Hitohito's attempt at a novel. But in the same way, she is not as perceptive as her brother, and will easily jump to supposed conclusions. 
Hitomi gives her brother romantic advice on several occasions, such as helping him buy a present for Komi for White Day without knowing who the recipient is. She quickly notices the romantic attraction between Hitohito and Komi, but after having seen Hitohito in drag and with together Katai, she begins to assume him to be gay. Hitomi and Hitohito share a single room in their family's apartment.

Jeanne is Hitohito's and Hitomi's mother. She meets Komi's family first when their families coincidentally make a holiday trip to the same campsite. Her face is not shown before Chapter 338. Believing Hitohito to be gay for a while due to Hitomi's reports, she is initially puzzled when Hitohito introduced Komi as his girlfriend. She is at first intimated by Komi, but after getting to know her better, she becomes happy about having Komi as part of her family.
Tadano's Father
Hitohito's and Hitomi's father only appears twice in the manga as of chapter 367. Once when the Tadano and Komi family happen to meet each other at a campsite.. And second when the Tadano family (and Najimi) visited their family home for New Year's. His face is not shown, nor is a name mentioned.

Shōsuke is Shōko's younger brother. Like his sister and father, he tends to be silent, but unlike them he is perfectly capable of talking but just chooses not to. He is tall and handsome and easily gets the attention of girls, but is uninterested. Like his father in high school, Shōsuke is sportive and gifted with his hands. And shown to be capable of excelling in any kind of task or skill.
Shōsuke has a far more introverted nature than his sister, and prefers to keep to himself most of the time. But he is also quite antisocial, as interacting with anyone, even his family, appears to be bothersome and a chore for him. Even considering the timid Yamada to still be annoying. He has an unwillingness to leave his house, and will avoid most interactions with people, except when it's about transacting business (paying at the register). He nevertheless has a good-natured side as well, such as saving Tadano and Rei on different occasions, and repairing Rei's toy.  
While Shōko is in her second year, he attends the Kisai High School, where he ends up as seatmates with Tadano's younger sister Hitomi. Hitomi mistakes his introversion for a social anxiety disorder and immediately makes it her duty to help him overcome it. Her incessant attempts to forcibly push him into social interactions tend to exhaust Shōsuke. Katai's younger sister Ai falls in love with Shōsuke, but he has yet to show if these feelings are mutual.
His name is the same play on words as his sister's on the word .

Shūko is Shōko's and Shōsuke's mother and a full-time housewife. She looks so much like her daughter that she sometimes gets mistaken for her or her sister. Unlike Shōko, her mother has a very outgoing personality and describes herself as "eternal 17-year old", somewhat to Shōko's embarrassment.
Shūko met her future husband Masayoshi in high school when she was actually 17. She was somewhat of a delinquent at that time and not interested in school. Masayoshi caught her eye with his good looks, his kindness, and his skills in craftsmanship and cooking.

Masayoshi is Shōko's and Shōsuke's father. Like his children, he talks very little and seems to suffer from a similar social anxiety disorder as his daughter. Somehow, Masayoshi and Shōko manage to communicate without words. Similar to Shōko, he can appear very intimidating to people not familiar to him.
He is of the same age as his wife Shūko, who he met at 17 in high school. He organised a flashmob to ask her on a date and took her with a motorcycle to the beach.
When Tadano and Shōko start to go out, Masayoshi "kidnaps" Tadano before their first date to put him to a test. On that occasion, they visit an aquarium where Masayoshi reveals himself to be enthusiastic about sea animals. After that "date", he becomes somewhat enamoured with Tadano. He later takes Tadano also to a sauna to get him to know better.

Yuiko is Masayoshi's mother and Shōko's grandmother and the matriarch of the Komi family. She lives in the countryside – in the same village where Inaka comes from –, where the family tends to visit her on holidays. Yuiko is somewhat strict but reveals a playful side when she engages with her grandchildren in games, usually with their allowance at stake.

Akira is Komi's young cousin. Akira is shy but likes Komi and loves to play with her. She also a tendency to burst into tears for many things, even when she is happy. However, when competition is involved, specifically in gambling, she displays a different side to her of a more confident ego. They tend to meet when Shōko's family visit their grandmother.

Ai is Makoto Katai's younger sister. She has long blond hair and usually wears a trenchcoat over her school uniform. In contrast to her brother, who only gets mistaken for a delinquent due to his physique and demeanor, Ai is actually one. She acts tough, has no interest in school, and gets into gang fights.
Ai visits the same high school as Shōsuke Komi and Hitomi and is classmates with them. She instantly falls in love with Shōsuke, revealing her softer side.

Other characters

Rei is the daughter of one of Komi's mother's school friends and stays at the Komis' house for a week over the summer holiday when her parents are away on a business trip. She is in the second year of elementary school.
Initially detached and emotionally aloof, she slowly warms to Shōko, her friends, and the other members of the Komi household. When she realizes that she is becoming attached to Komi, she runs away. With Najimi's help, Komi manages to find her and bring her home. Rei reveals that she had to move very often due to her parents' work, meaning she had to say farewell to her friends often and only after a short time. As a result, Rei decided to rather stay emotionally distant and not become attached to anyone else. When Komi explains to her that this is an opportunity to make many friends all over the world, Rei finally agrees. Before parting, Komi and Rei bet who can make 100 friends more quickly. After Rei and her family move to the United States, she manages to quickly befriend the foul-mouthed Mila, who somewhat begrudgingly accepts. When Komi is in the US on her class trip, she manages to meet up with Rei.

Momo is Rei's mother and an old school friend of Komi's mother Shūko. For work related reasons, she and her husband have to move regularly, also internationally.

Arai is a trainee in the beauty salon Komi frequents, where she washes the customers' hair and sweeps the floor.  She takes Komi's silence initially for disapproval, which makes her highly insecure. However, when Komi finally manages to express her gratitude without words, Arai is encouraged again.
Her name  translates literally to "hair-washing girl".

Karisu is the hair-dresser in the beauty salon Komi visits and a very charismatic personality. She knows Komi since she was a little kid. Thus, she is accustomed to Komi's silence and can easily understand her. It is later revealed that she is single and friends with Teshigawara, Tenjouin, and Toujouin.
Her name is a pun on the Japanese word for "charisma", .

Chocolat is a black female cat living in the cat café Komi visits and the "boss" of all the cats there. Normally distant to people, she takes pity on Komi when all the other cats avoid her and sees her dejected. Realizing that Komi is more thoughtful of the cat's feelings and would rather have them come to her, she lets Komi pet and cuddle her. The café eventually grants Komi the title "Chocolat Mama", because it's assumed that Chocolat became attached to her.

Teshigawara is an office lady who is in real urgent need of some tissues. She manages to get some from Komi who happens to hand out pocket tissues while helping Najimi on their summer job. Some time later, she encounters Nakanaka on a late night stroll and plays along when Nakanaka mimes using her umbrella as a gun. Teshigawara is friends with Karisu, Tenjouin, and Toujouin and like all of them single.
Her name is a pun on the Japanese phrase .

Akido is an expert on maid cafés. He has it taken onto him to visit one maid café per day, which leads him to the maid café organised by Komi's class during the school's culture festival. Despite being a critical maid expert, he is still a timid otaku around women. He happens to know Ren Sutejijuku since kindergarten and they mutually despise each other. Although a caption box remarks that they will eventually marry in a few years. 
Shouta, Michisato, Saiko and Ooki are four elementary school students living in Komi's neighborhood. They first meet her when Najimi invites them to a snowball fight. They later meet Komi again during summer vacation when they all take part in radio exercises, and then again when Komi and her friends help out selling food at a summer festival.
Saiko's name is a pun on the japanese word , meaning "small", despite her being by far the tallest of the four.

Tenjouin is a bus guide on Komi's class's school trip to Kyoto. While highly motivated, she is slightly nervous and occasionally stumbles over words. The students' obvious lack of interest begins to disencourage her until she notices that Komi and Tadano are actually paying attention. She notices the romance between these both and wishes for them be get married.
Tenjouin is friends with Karisu, Teshigawara, and Toujouin and like all of them single.
Her name  literally means "tour guide".

Sutejijuku enthusiastically loves stage plays and visits 1208 theatre performances a year. She is not too discerning when it comes to the choice of the stage plays she visits and also attends random school plays. This leads her to the stage performance by Komi's class during the second year's culture festival where she witnesses a performance by Katai and Tadano (dressed as a girl). Sutejijuku knows maid connoisseur Akido since kindergarten and they mutually despise each other. Although a caption box remarks that they will eventually marry in a few years.

The Golden Skulls (subject to change) are a group of teenage boys who appear like typical playboys and attempt to pick up girls during different outings. But they constantly fail to approach any girls for being too shy and fearful.

Toujouin is a flight attendant on Komi's class's flight to New York for their second year's class trip. She takes particular care of Komi and is initially dejected by Komi's apparent indifference. A thank-you letter Komi gives her while deboarding restores her spirits, though.
Toujouin is friends with Karisu, Teshigawara, and Tenjouin and like all of them single.

Yamada is a classmate of Hitomi who more or less by chance gets dragged into a group date of Hitomi, Shōsuke, and Ai. He suspects both Hitomi and Ai might be interested in him romantically, though neither of them actually are.
His given name  means "the thirty-sixth".

Kawai is an old middle school classmate of Tadano and Najimi who was Tadano's first love, and was the one who rejected him, which caused him to change into his normal persona from the event. It was later revealed in the manga that in reality, she herself was in love with Tadano since long before the confession. But she had forced herself to reject him in order to help snap him out of his chuni phase. To return him to how she used to know him. After meeting Tadano again along with Komi at a summer training camp, Kawai challenges her for the right to date Tadano. After Kawai loses to Komi at a competition and they both get to know each other more, Kawai decides instead of stealing Tadano away from Komi to enter into a polyamorous relationship between all 3 of them. Although Komi is against the idea and would rather be friends with Kawai, Kawai decides to become her friend and eventually get Komi to agree to a relationship between them and Tadano.

Notes
 "Ch." and "Vol." are shortened forms for chapter and volume of the Komi Can't Communicate manga
 "Ep." is shortened form for episode and refers to an episode number of the Komi Can't Communicate anime television series

References

Komi Can't Communicate
Characters